Women Men Marry is a 1922 silent film drama produced and directed by Edward Dillon.

Cast
E. K. Lincoln – Dick Clark
Florence Dixon – Emerie Rogers
Charles Hammond – Montgomery Rogers
Hedda Hopper – Eleanor Carter
Cyril Chadwick – Lord Brooks Fitzroy
Margaret Seddon – Hetty Page
Richard Carlyle – Adam Page
Julia Swayne Gordon – Aunt Gertrude
Maude Turner Gordon – Lady Mowbray
James Harrison – Warren Mortimer

Preservation status
A print survives at Filmmuseum Amsterdam.

References

External links
Women Men Marry at IMDb.com

1/2 sheet poster

1922 films
American silent feature films
Films directed by Edward Dillon
American black-and-white films
Silent American drama films
1922 drama films
1920s American films